Allama Iqbal Colony is a residential neighbourhood in Lyari Town, located in the Karachi South district of Karachi, Pakistan. 

This neighbourhood, Allama Iqbal Colony, is named after Allama Iqbal, the national poet of Pakistan.

Lyari Town is known to be multi-ethnic with religious diversity. Residents include several ethnic groups including Muhajirs, Sindhis, Punjabis, Kashmiris, Seraikis, Pakhtuns, Balochs, Memons, Bohras Ismailis.

References

External links 
 Karachi website - Archived

Neighbourhoods of Karachi
Lyari Town